Tshuah-ping (Taiwanese Hokkien: 礤冰 or 剉冰; Pe̍h-ōe-jī: chhoah-peng) or Tsua bing, also known as Baobing in Mandarin, is a shaved ice dessert introduced to Taiwan during Taiwan under Japanese rule, and then spread from Taiwan to Greater China and countries with large regional Overseas Chinese populations such as Malaysia and Singapore. It is especially popular in Taiwan where the dish has a variation called xuehua bing, in which the ice is not made out of water but milk.

The dessert consists of a large mound of ice shavings with various toppings on top. A wide variety of toppings exist, but the most common ones include sugar water, condensed milk, adzuki beans, mung beans, and tapioca balls. Fruit are also used according to the season. Mango baobing is typically only available in the summer, while strawberry baobing is available in the winter. Traditionally, these shavings were created by hand using a large mallet to crush ice or a blade to shave ice. Now, most stores use machines, which result in finer, thinner ice shavings.

See also
 Taiwanese cuisine
 List of Taiwanese desserts and snacks
Shaved ice § Regions, for similar shaved ice variations around the world.
Kakigōri: Japanese shaved ice
Bingsu: Korean shaved ice
Halo-halo: Filipino shaved ice (derived from Japanese Kakigori)
Es campur and Es teler: Indonesian shaved ice
Namkhaeng sai and O-aew: Thai shaved ice
Ais Kacang (ABC): Malaysian shaved ice
Grattachecca: Italian shaved ice popular in Rome.
Hawaiian shave ice: Hawaiian shaved ice

References

Chinese desserts
Ice-based desserts
Taiwanese desserts